This is a list of listed buildings in Hørsholm Municipality, Denmark.

The list

2960 Rungsted Kyst

2970 Hørsholm

References

External links

 Danish Agency of Culture

 
Horsholm